Mangeliidae  is a monophyletic family of small to medium-sized, predatory sea snails, marine gastropod mollusks in the superfamily Conoidea.

Prior to 2011, both the subfamilies Mangeliinae and Oenopotinae had been placed in the family Conidae. In 2011, Bouchet, Kantor et al merged the two subfamilies into one taxon, which they elevated to the rank of family. This was based on anatomical characters and a dataset of molecular sequences of three gene fragments.

Mangeliidae is a sister-clade to the family Raphitomidae

As with their relatives in the family Conidae, species in the family Mangelidae use potent venoms to catch their prey. Through this characteristic, they are of interest in pharmacological research.

Description
This family is characterized in general by usually the lack of an operculum, by a deep anal sinus on the subsutural ramp and with a heavy callus on the shoulder slope of the outer lip.

The Mangeliidae are small to medium-sized gastropods (length usually smaller than 30 mm). The high-spired shell has a fusiform to an oval or biconical shape. The protoconch is helicoid, with a very small initial, and rapidly increasing subsequent whorls. The spire is usually comparatively low. The shoulders of the whorls are often angular. The axial ribs are dominant in the sculpture of the shell. The spiral sculpture often consists of fine striae with a microsculpture of spirally aligned granules (especially on the subsutural ramp). The texture of the adult shell is frequently "gritty," from a sculpture of minute grains. The aperture is oval-elongated, usually narrow, terminating in a rather short, truncated siphonal canal. The aperture is only rarely denticulate. The outer lip (labrum) is reinforced. The varix is usually well developed, and the fasciole evanescent. A series of pustules on the columella is an ordinary feature. The toxoglossate radula has a weak basal ribbon and relatively short marginal teeth with very variable morphology (from semi-enrolled to true hypodermic). The tooth cavity opens laterally.

However, the genera Neoguraleus and Liracraea are operculate; the operculum in these genera has a terminal nucleus. These exceptions mean that the reinforced outer lip is the most characteristic feature of this family.

The species in this family occurred from the Paleogene to Recent.

Genera 
This is a list of the accepted names of genera in the family Mangeliidae (the main reference for Holocene species is the World Register of Marine Species):

 Acmaturris  Woodring, 1928 
 Agathotoma  Cossman, 1899 
 † Amblyacrum Cossmann, 1889
 Anticlinura Thiele, 1934  
 Antiguraleus Powell, 1942  
 Apispiralia Laseron, 1954  
 Apitua  Laseron, 1954
 Austrobela Criscione, Hallan, Puillandre & Fedosov, 2020
 Bactrocythara Woodring, 1928 
 Bela Gray, 1847 
 Belalora Powell, 1951
 † Belidaphne Vera-Peláez, 2002  
 Bellacythara McLean, 1971  
 Benthomangelia Thiele, 1925 
 Brachycythara  Woodring, 1928 
 † Buchozia Bayan, 1873 
 Cacodaphnella Pilsbry & Lowe, 1933  
 Citharomangelia  Kilburn, 1992 
 Cryoturris  Woodring, 1928 
 Curtitoma Bartsch, 1941
 Cythara  Fischer, 1883  (nomen dubium)
 Cytharopsis A. Adams, 1865
 Eucithara  Fischer, 1883 
 Euryentmema Woodring, 1928
 Genotina Vera-Peláez, 2004
 Gingicithara  Kilburn, 1992 
 Glyphoturris  Woodring, 1928 
 Granotoma Bartsch, 1941
 Granoturris Fargo, 1953  
 Guraleus  Hedley, 1918 
 Hemicythara  Kuroda & Oyama, 1971 
 Heterocithara  Hedley, 1922 
 Ithycythara  Woodring, 1928  
 Kurtzia  Bartsch 1944  
 Kurtziella  Dall, 1918 
 Kurtzina Bartsch, 1944 
 Kyllinia Garilli & Galletti, 2007
 Leiocithara  Hedley, 1922 
 Liracraea  Odhner, 1924 
 Lorabela Powell, 1951
 Macteola  Hedley, 1918  
 Mangelia  Risso, 1826 
 Marita  Hedley, 1922 
 Mitraguraleus Laseron, 1954
 Neoguraleus  Powell, 1939  
 Notocytharella  Hertlein & Strong, 1955  
 Obesotoma Bartsch, 1941
 Oenopota Mörch, 1852
 Oenopotella A. Sysoev, 1988
 Papillocithara  Kilburn, 1992  
 Paraguraleus  Powell, 1944  
 Paraspirotropis Sysoev & Kantor, 1984  
 Perimangelia  McLean, 2000  
 Platycythara  Woodring, 1928
 Propebela Iredale, 1918
 Pseudorhaphitoma  Boettger, 1895 
 Pyrgocythara  Woodring, 1928 
 Rubellatoma Bartsch & Rehder, 1939  
 Saccharoturris  Woodring, 1928 
 Sorgenfreispira Moroni, 1979 
 Stellatoma  Bartsch & Rehder, 1939  
 Suturocythara  Garcia, 2008 
 Tenaturris  Woodring, 1928 
 Toxicochlespira Sysoev & Kantor, 1990
 Venustoma Bartsch, 1941
 Vexiguraleus Powell, 1942  
 Vitricythara Fargo, 1953

Genera moved to other families 
 Anacithara  Hedley, 1922 : brought into the new family Horaiclavidae
 Austropusilla  Laseron, 1954: brought into the new family Raphitomidae
 Belaturricula Powell, 1951 : brought into the new family Borsoniidae
 Clathromangelia Monterosato, 1884 : brought into the new family Clathurellidae
 Conopleura  Hinds, 1844 : belongs to Drilliidae
 Euclathurella  Woodring, 1928 : belongs to the new family Clathurellidae
 Glyptaesopus   Pilsbry & Olsson, 1941: brought into the new family Borsoniidae
 Lienardia  Jousseaume, 1884 : brought into the new family Clathurellidae
 Lioglyphostomella  Shuto, 1970 : brought into the new family Pseudomelatomidae
 Otitoma Jousseaume, 1898 : belongs to the new family Pseudomelatomidae
 Paraclathurella  Boettger, 1895 : belongs to the new family Clathurellidae
 Paramontana  Laseron, 1954 : belongs to the new family Raphitomidae
 Pseudoetrema  Oyama, 1953 : belongs to the new family Clathurellidae
 Thelecythara Woodring, 1928   : belongs to the new family Horaiclavidae
 Turrella  Laseron, 1954 : belongs to the new family Clathurellidae
 Vitjazinella Sysoev 1988  : belongs to the Raphitomidae

 Genera brought into synonymy 
 Canetoma Bartsch, 1941: synonym of Propebela Iredale, 1918
 Cestoma Bartsch, 1941: synonym of Propebela Iredale, 1918
 Cithara: synonym of Cythara Schumacher, 1817
 Clathromangilia: synonym of Clathromangelia Monterosato, 1884: belongs now to the family Clathurellidae
 Clinuromella Beets, 1943: synonym of Anticlinura Thiele, 1934
 Clinuropsis Thiele, 1929: synonym of Anticlinura Thiele, 1934
 Cyrtocythara F. Nordsieck, 1977: synonym of Mangelia Risso, 1826
 Cytharella Monterosato, 1875: synonym of  Mangelia (Cytharella) Monterosato, 1875
 Ditoma Bellardi, 1875: synonym of Agathotoma Cossman, 1899
 Euguraleus Cotton, 1947: synonym of Guraleus Hedley, 1918
 Fehria  van Aartsen, 1988 : synonym of Bela Gray, 1847
 Funitoma Bartsch, 1941: synonym of Propebela Iredale, 1918
 Ginnania Monterosato, 1884: synonym of Bela Gray, 1847
 Lora Auctores non Gray, 1847: synonym of Oenopota Mörch, 1852
 Mangilia Lovén, 1846: synonym of Mangelia Risso, 1826
 Mangiliella  Bucquoy, Dautzenberg & Dollfus, 1883 : synonym of Mangelia Risso, 1826
 Nematoma Bartsch, 1941: synonym of Curtitoma Bartsch, 1941
 Nodotoma Bartsch, 1941: synonym of Oenopota Mörch, 1852
 Pseudoraphitoma: synonym of Pseudorhaphitoma Boettger, 1895
 Rissomangelia  Monterosato, 1917  : synonym of Mangelia Risso, 1826
 Rugocythara  Nordsieck, 1977  : synonym of Mangelia Risso, 1826
 Scabrella Hedley, 1918: synonym of Asperdaphne Hedley, 1922
 Smithia Monterosato, 1884: synonym of Smithiella Monterosato, 1890
 Smithiella  Monterosato, 1890  : synonym of Mangelia Risso, 1826
 Thelecytharella  Shuto, 1969 : synonym of Otitoma Jousseaume, 1898 : belongs to the family Pseudomelatomidae
 Thetidos Hedley, 1899: synonym of Lienardia Jousseaume, 1884 : belongs to the family Clathurellidae
 Turritomella Bartsch, 1941: synonym of Propebela Iredale, 1918
 Villiersiella Monterosato, 1890: synonym of Mangelia Risso, 1826
 Widalli Bogdanov, 1986: synonym of Curtitoma Bartsch, 1941
 Cythara Schumacher, 1817 (nomen dubium)

References 

Vaught, K.C. (1989). A classification of the living Mollusca. American Malacologists: Melbourne, FL (USA). . XII, 195 pp

External links
 
 
 Worldwide Mollusc Species Data Base: Mangeliidae